Polyxeni is a 2017 Greek drama film directed by Dora Masklavanou. It was selected as the Greek entry for the Best Foreign Language Film at the 91st Academy Awards, but it was not nominated.

Cast
 Katia Goulioni as Polyxeni
 Özgür Emre Yildirim as Kerem
 Lydia Fotopoulou as Mother
 Akilas Karazisis as Father
 Alexandros Mylonas as Priest

See also
 List of submissions to the 91st Academy Awards for Best Foreign Language Film
 List of Greek submissions for the Academy Award for Best Foreign Language Film

References

External links
 

2017 films
2017 drama films
Greek drama films
2010s Greek-language films
Films set in Greece